Public Square Street (formerly ) is a street in Yau Ma Tei, Kowloon, Hong Kong.

Location
The street runs in an east-west alignment from Cliff Road to Ching Ping Street, meeting Nathan Road, Temple Street, Shanghai Street, Reclamation Street and Canton Road in its course.

History
The street was built in 1887.

A large-scale reclamation was carried out in Yau Ma Tei between 1900 and 1904, between today's Reclamation Street and Ferry Street. Public Square Street was extended to Ferry Street accordingly.

The end of the street, near present-day Ferry Street, the Yau Ma Tei Ferry Pier was one of main pier for ferry transport across Victoria Harbour between Kowloon and Hong Kong Island. The ferry pier was completed in 1923. The pier was later relocated to Ferry Point near Kwun Chung.

The Tin Hau Temple Complex, a school and a community office were built in Public Square Street at the end of the 19th century by the leaders of the Yau Ma Ti Kaifong. In 1966, they all were still standing in a form similar to their original one.

Features
The public square in the street's name refers to Yung Shue Tau, a gathering place in front of the Tin Hau Temple in Yau Ma Tei.  Apart from the landmarks of Yung Shue Tau and Tin Hau Temple, there are also the night market of Temple Street, historical Yau Ma Tei Police Station, and Broadway Cinematheque.  Jade Market is just a few walks away.  On the other side of Nathan Road, the end near Cliff Road has steps leading to the hill of King's Park.

Landmarks and adjoining roads, from East to West:
 > Junction with Cliff Road. At the foot of King's Park hill
 > Junction with Nathan Road
 Public Square Street Rest Garden
 Arthur Street Temporary Playground
 > Junction with Arthur Street
 Tin Hau Temple Complex. A declared monuments.
 > Junction with Temple Street
 Mido Cafe. At the corner of Public Square Street and Temple Street (north side)
 Yau Ma Tei Community Centre Rest Garden at Yung Shue Tau
 > Junction with Shanghai Street
 Henry G. Leong Yaumatei Community Centre. At the corner of Public Square Street and Shanghai Street
 > Junction with Reclamation Street
 Yau Ma Tei Jockey Club Polyclinic (Old Block)
 > Junction with Canton Road
 Yau Ma Tei Police Station. At the corner of Public Square Street and Canton Road. Now listed as a Grade II historic building, it was completed in 1922 and largely retains its original design. It replaced an older police station which was also located on Public Square Street.
 Prosperous Garden
 > Junction with Ching Ping Street

See also
 List of streets and roads in Hong Kong

References

Yau Ma Tei
Roads in Kowloon
Odonyms referring to a building